Pippin was a UK children's comic, published by Polystyle Publications between 1966 and 1986, featuring characters from British pre-school television programmes. Stories were generally of four or eight numbered panels, with a short sentence below each illustration (similar to Rupert), although some stories did appear in prose form.

Regular stories included The Pogles (whose Pippin character gave the comic its name), Bizzy Lizzy, Joe, The Woodentops, Andy Pandy, Bill and Ben, Camberwick Green, Trumpton, Chigley, Tich and Quackers, Toytown, Mary Mungo & Midge, The Moonbeans, Tales of the Riverbank, The Herbs, Mr Benn, Teddy Edward, Barnaby the Bear, Ivor the Engine, Rubovia and Sooty and Sweep. (Andy Pandy and Bill and Ben had also appeared regularly in Robin.)

Each issue was around 16 pages in colour and black and white, and also featured a puzzle page, readers letters and photographs, and a Bible story in which the characters were portrayed by children in costume.

A hardback annual was also published, containing new stories and puzzles and regular holiday specials. Around 1983 a special winter holiday edition reprinted some old strips from the past 15 years ("ask your older brothers or sisters").

A companion comic, Playland, was launched in 1968 and ran alongside Pippin until 1975 when the two titles were merged under the title Pippin in Playland – although each continued to issue separate annuals at Christmas. Several strips, such as Sooty, Andy Pandy, The Herbs and Camberwick Green, appeared in both comics at one time or another.

The first edition was published on 24 September 1966, and the final edition appeared on 26 September 1986 (absorbed into Buttons). Artists included Neville Main and Bill Melvin.

Pippin ran for 1044 issues.

References

External links
 Pippin and The Herbs
 Pippin Annuals

Comics publications